Colin Williams may refer to:

 Colin Williams, first vice-president of the Council for Aboriginal Rights in 1951
 Colin Welland (1934–2015), British actor and screenwriter originally named Colin Williams
 Colin J. Williams (born 1941), American sociologist
 Colin H. Williams (born 1950), British sociolinguist
 Colin Williams (priest) (born 1955), Archdeacon of Lancaster from 1999 to 2005
 Colin Williams (producer), of Jim Henson's Pajanimals
 Colin Williams, dean of University of Plymouth Colleges network
 Colin Williams, guitarist for British band His Majesty (founded 1983)
 Colin Williams, OBE, formerly Director, Scotland, The Princess Royal Trust for Carers, recipient of 2006 New Year Honours